Maxim Sergeyevich Stepanov (born 3 February 1980) is a Russian sport shooter.

He participated at the 2018 ISSF World Shooting Championships, winning a medal.

References

External links

Living people
1980 births
Russian male sport shooters
Running target shooters
Sportspeople from Saint Petersburg